Socket F+ (also Socket Fr2 internally ) is a CPU Socket for AMD server processors starting from the 45 nm generation of the K10 CPU family. It is the successor to Socket F. The main difference between the two sockets is the supported HyperTransport version, while Socket F supports HyperTransport 2.0 at 1.0 GHz speed, Socket F+ supports HyperTransport 3.0 at up to 2.6 GHz speed and is backwards compatible with version 1.0 and 2.0.

See also
List of AMD microprocessors

References

AMD server sockets